Mizan (also Romanized as Mīzān) is a village in Shaban Rural District, in the Central District of Meshgin Shahr County, Ardabil Province, Iran. At the 2006 census, its population was 632, in 143 families.

References 

Towns and villages in Meshgin Shahr County